Jean Dubé (born December 3, 1981) is a Canadian concert pianist. In 2002 he won the International Franz Liszt Piano Competition.

Life and career
Born in Edmonton, Alberta, Dubé began playing piano at the age of 3 and played in public at age 4. A child prodigy, he won a Steinway piano at the age of 9 during the national competition "Jeunes Prodiges Mozart à  Paris". The same year, he played as a soloist at the Maison de la Radio with the Radio France Philharmonic Orchestra, live on France Musique. His discography already includes thirty recordings including twenty CDs, especially with  Syrius, Bnl and Naxos labels  in addition to several DVDs of concertos for French television and other foreign radio and television networks. Very comfortable in all repertoires, including those for the  left hand alone, he is one of the few pianists in the world able to play Ligeti's piano concerto and to give in a single recital the "Vingts Regards sur l’Enfant Jésus "of Messiaen. He likes to associate other arts with music (painting, sculpture, cinema, literature) and give themed recitals (bells, birds, love, dance, water and gardens ...). His interpretation of the Turangalîlâ was the best show of the year in 2000 in Riga and that of Liszt's 2nd Hungarian Rhapsody won in 2002 the fastest replay in the history of Radio Chicago (WFMT station).Unanimous  First Prize of the National Conservatory of Paris( Perfectionnement) at  the age of 14 under Jacques Rouvier, he studied with Jacqueline Robin, Catherine Collard and with John O'Conor in Dublin, thanks to a full year Yvonne Lefébure scholarship. Winner of the European Piano Competition Ouistreham Riva 2009, which also awarded him the Chopin Association Prize in Nohant, he also won the First Grand Prix unanimously and the Public Prize at the Franz Liszt Competition in Utrecht 2002 as well as other international competitions (Francis Poulenc, Bucharest, Messiaen, Bourse Yvonne Lefébure Orléans XXth Century). Invited as a member of the jury of international competitions (Pinerolo 2004, Poulenc 2008, Chang Chun 2009, Franz Liszt Utrecht 2019), he also gives master classes (Finland, Hungary, Netherlands, Ecuador, Ethiopia, South Africa, China, Malta ...). He plays on all continents as a soloist, chamber music groups and with many large orchestras. He has just recorded the Liszt Sonata in addition to  a CD dedicated to  Native American Indian music for the Syrius label. He collaborates on a  regular basis with Julia Le Brun, ( a lecturer and opera specialist, www.levoyagelyrique.com)and is one of the Concertino artistic directors. ( www.concertino.fr).

Discography 
 Jean Dubé - Jean Sibelius
Œuvres pour piano
Romance, Valse triste, Finlandia Op. 26 No. 7, Petite Sérénade  (released 05/2005; label:SYRIUS)
 Jean Dubé - Jean Cras 
L'œuvre pour piano
Paysage maritime, Maysage champêtre, Poèmes intimes, Danze   (released 02/2006; label:SYRIUS)
 Jean Dubé - Jean Cras, Hervé Roullet
Croquis Champêtres et Voyages oniriques (Roullet) ; Deux impromptus, Polyphème : Interlude, Âmes d'enfants pour quatre mains (Cras), Xavier Bouchaud deuxième piano, (2009, label: SYRIUS, Catalog number: 141430)
 Jean Dubé - Franz Liszt
Ballades, Polonaises, Trois morceaux suisses
Deux Polonaises, Ballade No.1 in D flat major, Ballade No.2 in B minor, Au bord d'une source, Trois morceaux suisses    (Catalogue No: 8.557364 ; label:NAXOS)
 Jean Dubé - Franz Liszt
Les Préludes, La campanella, Sonetto 104 del    
Petrarca, Sonetto 123 del Petrarca, Les jeux d'eau à la   
Villa d'Este, Bénédiction de Dieu dans la solitude,    
Hungarian Rhapsody No. 2     (released 10/2003;  label:SYRIUS)
 Jean Dubé - César Franck
Oeuvres & arrangements pour piano
Prélude, Choral et Fugue
Prélude, Aria et Final
Prélude, Fugue et Variation
Troisième Choral     (released 05/2004; label:SYRIUS)
 Jean Dubé - "Bach...In Nomine"
Beethoven, Glinka, Liszt, Mendelssohn,
Nielsen, Prokofieff, Reinken, Schumann, Villa-Lobos ( Label: SYRIUS ;Catalog number:SYR 141402)
Jean Dubé - "Toccatas"
Purcell, Scarlatti, Pasquini, Nägeli, Czerny, Wieck, Schumann, Balakirev, Chaminade, Massenet, Saint-Saëns, Debussy, Khatchatourian, Holst, Poulenc et Ravel(Label:SYRIUS;Cat.number:SYR 141406)
Jean Dubé, piano, with Adrien Frasse-Sombet, cello - "Edvard Grieg, Sergueï Rachmaninov: Sonatas for cello and piano"
E. Grieg: Sonate opus 6 - Intermezzo ; S.Rachmaninov: Vocalise opus 34 n°14. (released 03/2007; Label: SYRIUS ; Catalog number : SYR-141409)

See also
 International Franz Liszt Piano Competition

Sources

External links 
 
 The International Franz Liszt Piano Competition's website

1981 births
Male classical pianists
International Franz Liszt Piano Competition winners
Living people
Musicians from Edmonton
Alumni of the Royal Irish Academy of Music
Conservatoire de Paris alumni
Pedal piano players